Redwater is a city in Bowie County, Texas, United States. The population was 853 at the 2020 census. It is part of the Texarkana metropolitan area.

History
Redwater is twelve miles southwest of Texarkana in southeastern Bowie County. It grew up in the mid-1870s around a sawmill operated by two men named Daniels and Spence, who named the community Ingersoll, in honor of the agnostic Robert Ingersoll. A post office was established in 1881, and by 1884 the town had an estimated population of fifty.

In 1886 a big revival meeting was held in the town, which resulted in about 110 conversions. Shortly after the meeting residents of the town, no longer wishing to honor the agnostic, decided that the name of the town should be changed. They had just completed a new well that yielded red water, and the town was renamed for this feature. The name of the post office was not officially changed until 1894. Although the population of the town swelled to an estimated 300 by 1892, by 1900 it had fallen to 128. It reached 250 in the 1920s.

During World War II the Red River Army Depot and Lone Star Army Ammunition Plant were built just north of Redwater, providing thousands of jobs for county residents. The population of Redwater jumped from 250 in the early 1940s to 457 by 1950. In 1982 Redwater had a population of 460 and five rated businesses. In 1990 the population was 894.

Redwater is also home to the first recorded set of quadruplets in the United States.

The town is also the birthplace of Kenny Wayne, or also known as "The Original Kenny Wayne." A Texas Blues and Rock'n'Roll musician, he toured and played many stages, including the Four States Fair & Rodeo. He also started up and formerly had been the front-man of bands such as "Kenny Wayne and the Kamotions," "Grapes of Wrath," and "The Starchiefs." He was the founder and General Manager of Candy Records. He was based out of Irving, Texas, at the time of his death on August 23, 2021.

Geography

Redwater is located at  (33.360255, –94.253993).

Demographics

As of the 2020 United States census, there were 853 people, 421 households, and 289 families residing in the city.

According to the 2010 census, there were 1,057 people in the city. The racial makeup of the city was 87.27% White, 9.98% African American, 0.80% Native American, and 1.95% from two or more races. Hispanic or Latino of any race were 1.26% of the population.

There were 330 households, out of which 40.6% had children under the age of 18 living with them, 56.1% were married couples living together, 13.3% had a female householder with no husband present, and 25.5% were non-families. 23.0% of all households were made up of individuals, and 8.5% had someone living alone who was 65 years of age or older. The average household size was 2.64 and the average family size was 3.10.

In the city, the population was spread out, with 29.2% under the age of 18, 10.6% from 18 to 24, 28.2% from 25 to 44, 19.8% from 45 to 64, and 12.2% who were 65 years of age or older. The median age was 33 years. For every 100 females, there were 96.8 males. For every 100 females age 18 and over, there were 89.8 males.

The median income for a household in the city was $31,111, and the median income for a family was $38,000. Males had a median income of $30,600 versus $19,667 for females. The per capita income for the city was $13,843. About 10.9% of families and 16.6% of the population were below the poverty line, including 22.2% of those under age 18 and 17.1% of those age 65 or over.

Education 
The City of Redwater is served by the Redwater Independent School District.

References

External links
 Official City Website

Cities in Bowie County, Texas
Cities in Texas
Cities in Texarkana metropolitan area